Social policy is a plan or action of government or institutional agencies which aim to improve or reform society.

Some professionals and universities consider social policy a subset of public policy, while other practitioners characterize social policy and public policy to be two separate, competing approaches for the same public interest (similar to MD and DO in healthcare), with social policy deemed more holistic than public policy.  Whichever of these persuasions a university adheres to, social policy begins with the study of the welfare state and social services.  It consists of guidelines, principles, legislation and associated activities that affect the living conditions conducive to human welfare, such as a person's quality of life.  The Department of Social Policy at the London School of Economics defines social policy as "an interdisciplinary and applied subject concerned with the analysis of societies' responses to social need", which seeks to foster in its students a capacity to understand theory and evidence drawn from a wide range of social science disciplines, including economics, sociology, psychology, geography, history, law, philosophy and political science. The Malcolm Wiener Center for Social Policy at Harvard University describes social policy as "public policy and practice in the areas of health care, human services, criminal justice, inequality, education, and labor". Social policy might also be described as actions that affect the well-being of members of a society through shaping the distribution of and access to goods and resources in that society. Social policy often deals with wicked problems.

The discussion of 'social policy' in the United States and Canada can also apply to governmental policy on social issues such as tackling racism, LGBT issues (such as same-sex marriage) and the legal status of abortion, guns, euthanasia, recreational drugs and prostitution. In other countries, these issues would be classified under health policy and domestic policy.

The study of social policy can either be a stand-alone degree at providers such as the University of Birmingham, University of York, Oxford University, and the University of Pennsylvania, or a specialization as part of a public policy degree program such as at McGill University, Balsillie School of International Affairs, Harris School of Public Policy, and the Hertie School of Governance. In the Global South, social policy is offered along with public policy degree programmes, as at the Institute of Public Policy, National Law School of India University, Bangalore, combined with development policy.

History

Social policy was first conceived in the 1940s by Richard Titmuss within the field of social administration in Britain.  Titmuss's essay on the "Social Division of Welfare" (1955) laid the development for social policy to gradually absorb social administration.  Titmuss was an essayist whose work concerned the failure of the market; the inadequacy of selective social services; and the superiority of collectivism and universal approaches.  While some scholars describe social policy as an interdisciplinary field of practice, scholars like Fiona Williams and Pete Alcock believe social policy is a discipline unto itself.

Some of the earliest examples of direct intervention by government in human welfare date back to Ancient Rome's Cura Annonae (grain dole) founded in 123 BC, and Umar ibn al-Khattāb's rule as the second caliph of Islam in the 6th century: he used zakat collections and also other governmental resources to establish pensions, income support, child benefits, and various stipends for people of the non-Muslim community.  The enactment of English Poor Laws helped curb poverty and recidivism: these laws influenced the justices of Berkshire to implement the Speenhamland system, which was the first social program in the modern sense of that word.  In the modern West, proponents of scientific social planning such as the sociologist Auguste Comte, and social researchers, such as Charles Booth, contributed to the emergence of social policymaking in the first industrialised countries following the Industrial Revolution. Surveys of poverty exposing the brutal conditions in the urban slum conurbations of Victorian Britain supplied the pressure leading to changes such as the decline and abolition of the poor law system and Liberal welfare reforms. Other significant examples in the development of social policy are the Bismarckian welfare state in 19th century Germany, social security policies in the United States introduced under the rubric of the New Deal between 1933 and 1935, and both the Beveridge Report and the National Health Service Act 1946 in Britain.  Thus, two major models of social insurance arose in practice:  Bismarkian welfare from Germany and Beveridgean welfare from Britain.

Social policy in the 21st century is complex and in each state it is subject to local and national governments, as well as supranational political influence. For example, membership of the European Union is conditional on member states' adherence to the Social Chapter of European Union law

Types

Social policy aims to improve human welfare and to meet human needs for education, health, housing and economic security. Important areas of social policy are wellbeing and welfare, poverty reduction, social security, justice, unemployment insurance, living conditions, animal rights, pensions, health care, social housing, family policy, social care, child protection, social exclusion, education policy, crime and criminal justice, urban development, and labor issues.

United States social policy

The United States was a pioneer in generous social spending (relative to comparable countries), as it provided substantial social spending for Civil War veterans and their families. However, the United States would go on to lag behind other advanced industrial democracies in social spending.

Religious, racial, ideological, scientific and philosophical movements and ideas have historically influenced American social policy, for example, John Calvin and his idea of pre-destination and the Protestant Values of hard work and individualism. Moreover, Social Darwinism helped mold America's ideas of capitalism and the survival of the fittest mentality. The Catholic Church's social teaching has also been considerably influential to the development of social policy.

United States politicians who have favored increasing government observance of social policy often do not frame their proposals around typical notions of welfare or benefits; instead, in cases like Medicare and Medicaid, President Lyndon Johnson presented a package called the Great Society that framed a larger vision around poverty and quality of life. Insurance has been a growing policy topic, and a recent example of health care law as social policy is the Patient Protection and Affordable Care Act formed by the 111th U.S. Congress and signed into law by President Barack Obama, a Democrat, on March 23, 2010.

Moreover, former president Franklin D. Roosevelt's ground breaking New Deal is a paragon example of Social Policy that focused predominantly on a program of providing work and stimulating the economy through public spending on projects, rather than on cash payment. The programs were in response to the Great Depression affecting the United States in the 1930s.

One example of a recent, widely discussed education policy change was the passage of the No Child Left Behind Act (NCLB) during the administration of Republican President George W. Bush with bipartisan support. The law took effect on January 8, 2002, attempting to raise standards in education, address educational inequities (framed as an achievement gap), and issues in schools framed as issues of accountability. The No Child Left Behind Act required every state to assess students on basic skills to receive federal funding. While the law did attempt to address issues underlying U.S. education, it's provisions were widely viewed as unsuccessful. States continued to create their own standards while assessing themselves. NCLB also led to the closure of numerous schools labeled "low-performing" or "failing", disproportionately impacting schools that served predominately Black students and rural communities.  Provisions of NCLB were changed and replaced under the Race to the Top and Every Child Succeeds Act passed during the Administration of President Barack Obama.

See also

Criminology
Education policy
Great Society
Health policy
Housing policy
Medicaid
Medicare
Social insurance
Social Security Administration
Social Security (United States)
Social theory

References

Further reading

Social Policy & Administration
Titmuss, R. M. (1951) Problems of social policy. HM Stationery Office. 
Dean, H. (2006). Social Policy. Cambridge: Polity Press. .
 Esping-Andersen, G. (1990) The three worlds of welfare capitalism. Princeton: Princeton University Press.
 Ferragina, Emanuele and Martin Seeleib-Kaiser, "Welfare Regime Debate: Past, Present, Futures?" Policy & Politics: 39 (2011): 4: 583–611.

Comparative politics